The Grizzly I was a Canadian-built M4A1 Sherman tank with relatively minor modifications, primarily to stowage and pioneer tool location and adding accommodations for a number 19 radio set. They used the same General Steel hull castings as late Pressed Steel M4A1(75)s, to include both the standard hull and the later ones with the armour thickened over the ammo bins. Grizzlies were originally built with US style tracks and sprockets. It was only later that they were refitted with Canadian Dry Pin (CDP) tracks, which did not require rubber.

The tank's  production was stopped as it became apparent US production would be sufficient for the Allies' needs and the factory was turned over to other production. After the war, a number of Grizzly tanks were sold to Portugal as part of the NATO military assistance program; they were retired in the 1980s.

History
After the fall of France, it was decided the nascent Canadian armoured divisions would be equipped by tanks produced in Canada. The result was the Ram cruiser tank, based on the chassis and running gear of the US M3 Lee; Rams were produced by the Montreal Locomotive Works (MLW) from 1941 to 1943. The M3 was succeeded by the superior M4 Sherman. The Allies agreed to standardise on the M4, and MLW began producing the Grizzly in August 1943.

Grizzly production halted when it became apparent US production would be sufficient. Instead, MLW produced the Sexton self-propelled gun Mk II. The Sexton Mk II used the Grizzly chassis, with the upper hull modified to carry the Commonwealth standard QF 25 pounder gun. The Sexton was the Commonwealth counterpart to the US M7 Priest. A small batch of Grizzly medium tanks were fitted with an Ordnance QF 17-pounder for training but none saw action.

After the war, a number of Grizzly tanks and Sexton self-propelled guns were sold to Portugal as part of the NATO military assistance program. They were retired in the 1980s.

Design
The Grizzly left the factory with the standard US 13 tooth sprocket.
 
The CDP tracks and 17 tooth sprocket, generally associated with the Grizzly were not introduced until after Grizzly production ceased.  Those, along with the heavier duty bogie units were developed for the Sexton, 25 pounder SP gun. At some later point, Grizzlies were retrofitted with the new sprocket and tracks.  The CDP track was lighter and simpler than the standard US tracks and did not require rubber, which was scarce since the Japanese advance into Southeast Asia and the conquest of Malaya.

Some were converted into the Skink anti-aircraft tank with a turret mounting four 20 mm Polsten guns.

See also

 Bob Semple tank – New Zealand indigenous tank design
 Ram tank – Canadian indigenous tank design
 Schofield tank – New Zealand indigenous tank design
 Sentinel tank – Australian indigenous tank design

References

External links

http://mailer.fsu.edu/~akirk/tanks/can/Canada.htm 
http://www.wwiivehicles.com/canada/tank-medium/grizzly.asp
http://www.militaryfactory.com/armor/detail.asp?armor_id=292
http://www.junobeach.org/e/4/can-tac-arm-can-e.htm

Cruiser tanks of Canada
Tanks of Canada
World War II armoured fighting vehicles of Canada
World War II medium tanks
M4 Sherman tanks
Military vehicles introduced from 1940 to 1944